KFTT (107.7 FM, "K-Fat 107.7") was a radio station licensed to serve Bagdad, Arizona. The station was owned by Murphy Broadcasting and licensed to Smoke and Mirrors, LLC. It aired an oldies music format.

The station was assigned the KFTT call letters by the Federal Communications Commission (FCC) on August 26, 2005.

On July 7, 2011, KFTT moved from 103.1 FM to 107.7 FM.

On February 1, 2013, KFTT changed their format from adult hits to oldies.  (info taken from stationintel.com)

On February 13, 2017, KFTT went silent. (info taken from stationintel.com)

On April 1, 2017, KFTT returned to the air with oldies, branded as "K-Fat 107.7". (info taken from stationintel.com)

The station's owners surrendered KFTT's license to the FCC on January 30, 2019. The FCC cancelled the license on February 1, 2019.

References

External links
 Murphy Broadcasting

FTT
Mass media in Yavapai County, Arizona
Radio stations established in 2002
2002 establishments in Arizona
Defunct radio stations in the United States
Radio stations disestablished in 2019
2019 disestablishments in Arizona
FTT